Elizabeth Poyntz (1587 – May 1673), second daughter of Sir John Pointz (died 1633) of Iron Acton in Gloucestershire and his second wife Elizabeth Sydenham, became Lady Thurles in 1608 when she married Thomas Butler, Viscount Thurles, son of Walter, 11th Earl of Ormond. Apparently, the marriage was against her father-in-law's wishes. This may have been less on her account than her father's: Sir John Pointz was notoriously improvident in matters of finance, and died penniless.

Some sources say that she lived in Thurles Castle from this marriage until her death (1608–1673), except for a short period (1658–1660) during the rule of Cromwell—she was a Catholic Royalist. It is not clear, however, that she could have returned to Thurles Castle because Lewis writes that "this castle, during the parliamentary war, was garrisoned for the King, but was afterwards taken by the parliamentarian forces, by whom it was demolished". On the other hand, Lady Thurles may have returned to a newer building on or close to the site of the castle which may also have been called Thurles Castle; Grose, writing in 1791, and Armitage, writing in 1912, seem to imply that a building called Thurles Castle still existed in their times.

She and Lord Thurles had three sons and four daughters before he drowned on 15 December 1619, when the ship carrying him to England was wrecked off the Skerries near Anglesey. This was shortly after the start of his father's long imprisonment in the Fleet Prison in London and Thomas had been on his way to answer charges of treason for having garrisoned Kilkenny.

After his death, Lady Thurles married again, in about 1620. With her second husband, Captain George Mathew of Radyr and Llandaff in Glamorganshire, Wales, she had two more sons and one more daughter. Her second husband died in 1636 at Tenby in Wales. She lived a further 37 years, dying in Thurles in May 1673. She was buried beside what is now the Protestant church of St. Mary's in Thurles.

An oil portrait of Lady Thurles is held by Tipperary County Library in Thurles.

Descendants

From the first marriage
Her eldest son, James Butler, became 1st Duke of Ormonde and Lord Lieutenant of Ireland. One of her daughters, Elizabeth Butler, married James Purcell, 12th Baron of Loughmoe, her son being Nicholas Purcell, the 13th (and last) Baron. Another daughter, Mary Butler (died 1675), married Sir George Hamilton (1607–1679), 1st Baronet of Donalong.

From the second marriage
One of the sons Lady Thurles had with her second husband was also called George Mathew; he had a daughter, Frances Mary Mathew, who, in 1723, married John Ryan, a member of one of the few remaining landed Catholic families in County Tipperary at the time, and lived with him at Inch House in the townland of Inch.

References

1587 births
1673 deaths
Elizabeth
Cavaliers
English Roman Catholics
People from South Gloucestershire District
People from Thurles
British courtesy viscountesses
Women in the English Civil War